"Our Day Will Come" is a popular song composed by Mort Garson with lyrics by Bob Hilliard. It was recorded by American R&B group Ruby & the Romantics in early December 1962, reaching #1 on the Billboard Hot 100.

Ruby & the Romantics' original version
The song's composers were hoping to place "Our Day Will Come" with an established easy listening act and only agreed to let the new R&B group Ruby & the Romantics record the song after Kapp Records' A&R director Al Stanton promised that, if the Ruby & the Romantics' single failed, Kapp would record the song with Jack Jones. Stanton cut two versions of "Our Day Will Come" with Ruby & the Romantics, one with a mid-tempo arrangement and the other in a bossa nova style; the latter version, featuring a Hammond organ solo, was selected for release as a single in December 1962 and reached #1 on the Billboard Hot 100 the week of March 23, 1963. "Our Day Will Come" also charted at #11 in Australia and at #38 the United Kingdom. The personnel on the original recording were: Leroy Glover on organ; Vinnie Bell, Al Gorgoni and Kenny Burrell on guitars; Russ Savakus on bass; Gary Chester on drums; and George Devens on percussion.

Charts

Frankie Valli version

American singer Frankie Valli recorded and released "Our Day Will Come" in 1975. His rendition features Patti Austin on accompanying vocals. Cash Box said that "minimum use of strings on top as the artist’s cutting sound and super-fine alto sax provides that icing that balances out the broad bottom indigenous to disco dance depots."

Valli's version reached #11 on the US Billboard Hot 100 and spent two weeks at #2 on the Adult Contemporary chart. Internationally, it also reached the #30 in Canada.

Record World called it "one of [Valli's] uniquely patented vocal workouts."

Charts

Weekly charts

Year-end charts

Amy Winehouse version

Recorded for her 2003 debut album Frank, the Amy Winehouse remake of "Our Day Will Come" was first issued on the singer's posthumous compilation album Lioness: Hidden Treasures. The song was released to UK contemporary hit radio on November 2, 2011, as the album's second single, Winehouse's first solo single release since "Love Is a Losing Game" in 2007 (a duet with Tony Bennett on "Body and Soul" had been issued as a single on September 14, 2011—which would have been her 28th birthday).

Producer Salaam Remi who had worked with Winehouse on her albums Frank and Back to Black, as well as on the posthumous compilation, stated that "Our Day Will Come" will serve as a poignant reminder of the star's talent. The music video for "Our Day Will Come": a montage of Winehouse throughout her career with clips from music videos, live performances and press coverage, was sent to UK music channels on 21 November 2011. Following the release of the music video, Winehouse's father tweeted: "I just almost watched Amy's 'Our Day Will Come' video. She is so lovely." Robert Copsey of Digital Spy gave the song four stars out of five and a positive review, stating:

That said, the thinking behind the decision to release Winehouse's rendition of Ruby and the Romantics' 1963 hit 'Our Day Will Come' quickly becomes apparent. Over a smoky melody and reggae-tinged beat she promises wistfully, "Our day will come, and we'll have everything," before professing her everlasting love for her beau. The result serves as a timely reminder that beneath the demons that plagued her final years, her raw talent was undeniable.

Charts

References

1963 singles
1963 songs
1975 singles
2011 singles
Amy Winehouse songs
Betty Everett songs
Billboard Hot 100 number-one singles
Bobby Darin songs
Bobby Rydell songs
Bobby Vinton songs
Brenda Lee songs
The Carpenters songs
Cashbox number-one singles
Cher songs
Christina Aguilera songs
Cliff Richard songs
Dionne Warwick songs
Doris Day songs
Frankie Valli songs
Herb Alpert songs
Isaac Hayes songs
Island Records singles
Jerry Butler songs
The Lettermen songs
Nancy Wilson (jazz singer) songs
Patti Page songs
Percy Faith songs
Ruby & the Romantics songs
Song recordings produced by Salaam Remi
Songs with lyrics by Bob Hilliard
Songs written by Mort Garson
The Supremes songs
Trini Lopez songs
We Five songs
Private Stock Records singles